Salvo D'Acquisto is a 1974 Italian biographical drama film directed by Romolo Guerrieri.

Plot 
Real life events of the Carabinieri member Salvo D'Acquisto, who during the Nazi occupation of Rome saved 22 civilians from being executed by German soldiers.

Cast 

 Massimo Ranieri: Salvo D'Acquisto
 Enrico Maria Salerno Rubino
 Lina Polito: Martina 
 Massimo Serato: Halder   
 Isa Danieli: Tatina   
 Ivan Rassimov: Sgt. Krone   
 Giustino Durano: Riccardo
 Mario Colli: L'ufficiale italiano 
 Carla Calò: La lavandaia
 Jole Fierro: La madre superiora
 Lucretia Love
 Lorenzo Piani

See also   
 List of Italian films of 1974

References

External links

1974 films
1970s biographical drama films
Italian biographical drama films
Italian Campaign of World War II films
Films set in Rome
Films set in 1943
Films directed by Romolo Guerrieri
Films scored by Carlo Rustichelli
1974 drama films
1970s Italian films
Cultural depictions of Italian men